Oracle bone script is an ancient form of Chinese characters that were engraved on oracle bonesanimal bones or turtle plastrons used in pyromantic divination. Oracle bone script was used in the late 2nd millennium BC, and is the earliest known form of Chinese writing. The vast majority of oracle bone inscriptions, of which about 150,000 pieces have been discovered, were found at the Yinxu site located in Xiaotun Village, Anyang, Henan Province. The latest significant discovery is the Huayuanzhuang storage of 1,608 pieces, 579 of which were inscribed, found near Xiaotun in 1993. They record pyromantic divinations of the last nine kings of the Shang dynasty, beginning with Wu Ding, whose accession is dated by different scholars at 1250 BC or 1200 BC.  Oracle bone inscriptions of Wu Ding's reign have been radiocarbon dated to 1254–1197 BC±10 years. After the Shang were overthrown by the Zhou dynasty in c. 1046 BC, divining with milfoil became more common, and a much smaller corpus of oracle bone writings date from the Western Zhou.  Thus far, no Zhou sites have been found with a cache of inscriptions on the same scale as that at Yinxu, although inscribed oracle bones appear to be more widespread, being found near most major population centers of the time, and new sites have continued to be discovered since 2000.

The late Shang oracle bone writings, along with a few roughly contemporaneous inscriptions in a different style cast in bronzes, constitute the earliest significant corpus of Chinese writing. The script is essential for the study of Chinese etymology, as Shang writing is the oldest known member and ancestor of the Chinese family of scripts, preceding the bronzeware script. It is also the direct ancestor of over a dozen East Asian writing systems developed over the next three millennia, including the Chinese and Japanese logographic and syllabaric scripts still in current use.  In terms of content, the inscriptions, which range from under ten characters for incomplete prognostications to over 100 characters in rare cases (a few dozen being typical), deal with a wide range of topics, including war, ritual sacrifice, agriculture, as well as births, illnesses, and deaths in the royal family. Thus, they provide invaluable insight into late Shang dynasty civilization and society.

Oraculology is the discipline for the study of oracle bones and the oracle bone script.

Name
This term is a translation of the English phrase "inscriptions upon bone and tortoise shell", which was coined by the American missionary Frank H. Chalfant (1862–1914) in his 1906 book Early Chinese Writing, and first appeared in Chinese books in the 1930s.
In earlier decades, Chinese authors used a variety of names for the inscriptions and the script, based on the place they were found (Yinxu), their purpose (bǔ  "to divine") or the method of writing (qì  "to engrave"), one common term being   ("Yinxu divinatory texts").

As the majority of oracle bones bearing writing date from the late Shang dynasty, oracle bone script essentially refers to a Shang script.

Precursors

It is certain that Shang-lineage writing underwent a period of development before the Anyang oracle bone script because of its mature nature. For example, many characters had already undergone extensive simplification and linearization; the processes of semantic extension and phonetic loan had also clearly been at work for some time, at least hundreds of years and perhaps longer. However, no significant quantity of clearly identifiable writing from before or during the early to middle Shang cultural period has been discovered. The few Neolithic symbols found on pottery, jade, or bone at a variety of cultural sites in China are very controversial, and there is no consensus that any of them are directly related to the Shang oracle bone script.

Style

The oracle bone script of the late Shang dynasty appears pictographic, as does its contemporary, the Shang writing on bronzes. The earliest oracle bone script appears even more so than examples from late in the period (thus some evolution did occur over the roughly 200-year period). Comparing the oracle bone script to both Shang and early Western Zhou period writing on bronzes, the oracle bone script is clearly greatly simplified, and rounded forms are often converted to rectilinear ones; this is thought to be due to the difficulty of engraving the hard, bony surfaces, compared with the ease of writing them in the wet clay of the molds the bronzes were cast from. The more detailed and more pictorial style of the bronze graphs is thus thought to be more representative of typical Shang writing (as would have normally occurred on bamboo books) than the oracle bone script forms, and this typical style continued to evolve into the Zhou period writing and then into the seal script of the Qin in the late Zhou period.

It is known that the Shang people also wrote with brush and ink, as brush-written graphs have been found on a small number of pottery, shell and bone, and jade and other stone items, and there is evidence that they also wrote on bamboo (or wooden) books just like those found from the late Zhou to Hàn periods, because the graphs for a writing brush (聿 yù, depicting a hand holding a writing brush) and bamboo book (冊 cè, a book of thin vertical slats or slips with horizontal string binding, like a closed Venetian blind turned 90 degrees) are present in the oracle bone script. Since the ease of writing with a brush is even greater than that of writing with a stylus in wet clay, it is assumed that the style and structure of Shang graphs on bamboo were similar to those on bronzes, and also that the majority of writing occurred with a brush on such books. Additional support for this notion includes the reorientation of some graphs, by turning them 90 degrees as if to better fit on tall, narrow slats; this style must have developed on bamboo or wood slat books and then carried over to the oracle bone script. Additionally, the writing of characters in vertical columns, from top to bottom, is for the most part carried over from the bamboo books to oracle bone inscriptions. In some instances lines are written horizontally so as to match the text to divinatory cracks, or columns of text rotate 90 degrees in mid stream, but these are exceptions to the normal pattern of writing, and inscriptions were never read bottom to top. The vertical columns of text in Chinese writing are traditionally ordered from right to left; this pattern is found on bronze inscriptions from the Shang dynasty onward. Oracle bone inscriptions, however, are often arranged so that the columns begin near the centerline of the shell or bone, and move toward the edge, such that the two sides are ordered in mirror-image fashion.

Structure and function

Despite the pictorial nature of the oracle bone script, it was a fully functional and mature writing system by the time of the Shang dynasty, i.e., able to record the Old Chinese language in its entirety and not just isolated kinds of meaning. This level of maturity clearly implies an earlier period of development of at least several hundred years. From their presumed origins as pictographs and signs, by the Shang dynasty, most graphs were already conventionalized in such a simplified fashion that the meanings of many of the pictographs are not immediately apparent. Compare, for instance, the pictographs at the left. Without careful research to compare these to later forms, one would probably not know that these represented 豕 shĭ "swine" and 犬 quǎn "dog" respectively. As Boltz (1994 & 2003 p. 31–33) notes, most of the oracle bone graphs are not depicted realistically enough for those who do not already know the script to recognize what they stand for; although pictographic in origin they are no longer pictographs in function. Boltz instead calls them zodiographs (p. 33), reminding us that functionally they represent words, and only through the words do they represent concepts, while for similar reasons Qiu labels them semantographs.

By the late Shang oracle bone script, the graphs had already evolved into a variety of mostly non-pictographic functions, including all the major types of Chinese characters now in use. Phonetic loan graphs, semantic-phonetic compounds, and associative compounds were already common. One structural and functional analysis of the oracle bone characters found that they were 23% pictographs, 2% simple indicatives, 32% associative compounds, 11% phonetic loans, 27% phonetic-semantic compounds, and 6% uncertain.

Although it was a fully functional writing system, the oracle bone script was not fully standardized. By the early Western Zhou period, these traits had vanished, but in both periods, the script was not highly regular or standardized; variant forms of graphs abound, and the size and orientation of graphs is also irregular. A graph when inverted horizontally generally refers to the same word, and additional components are sometimes present without changing the meaning. These irregularities persisted until the standardization of the seal script in the Qin dynasty.

There are over 30,000 distinct characters found from all the bone fragments so far, which may represent around 4,000 individual characters in their various forms. The majority of these still remain undeciphered, although scholars believe they can decipher between 1,500 and 2,000 of these characters. One reason for the difficulty in decipherment is that components of certain oracle bone script characters may differ in later script forms. Such differences may be accounted for by character simplification and/or by later generations misunderstanding the original graph, which had evolved beyond recognition. In this case, the modern character is a simplification of an archaic variant 𪛁 (or 𥤚) which is closer to the oracle bone script form - albeit with the insect figure being confused with the similar-looking character for 'turtle' (龜) and the addition of the 禾 component. (Another rarer simplification of 𪛁 is 龝, with 龜 instead of 火).

Another reason is that some characters exist only in the oracle bone script, dropping out of later usage (usually being replaced in their duties by other, newer characters). One good example is shown in the fragment labeled "Oracle script for Spring".  The top left character in this image has no known modern Chinese counterpart.  In such cases, context - when available - may be used to determine the possible meaning of the character. In other cases, the character may be assumed to be a phonosemantic compound, and its rough meaning can be inferred based on the semantic component.  For instance, an oracle bone character was recently found which consists of 礻 on the left and 升 on the right ([礻升] when converted from oracle bone forms to their modern printed equivalents).  This character may reasonably be guessed to a compound with 示 ('altar') as the semantic and 升 (modern reading 'sheng') as the phonetic.  Though no modern character consists of these two components, it likely refers to a type of Shang dynasty ritual with a name similar to the pronunciation of 升 in Old Chinese.  In the same collection of fragments, the character [阝心] was surmised to be a place name, since the semantic component 阜 means 'mound; hill', and the divination concerned the king traveling for a royal hunt.

Zhou dynasty oracle bones

The numbers of oracle bones with inscriptions contemporaneous with the end of Shang and the beginning of Zhou is relatively few in number compared with the entire corpus of Shang inscriptions. Until 1977, only a few inscribed shell and bone artifacts were known. Zhou related inscriptions have been unearthed since the 1950s, with find fragments having only one or two characters. In August 1977, a large hoard of several thousand pieces was discovered in an area closely related to the heartland of the ancient Zhou. Of these, only two or three hundred items were inscribed.

Scholarship

Among the major scholars making significant contributions to the study of the oracle bone writings, especially early on, were:
 Wang Yirong recognized the characters as being ancient Chinese writing in 1899.
 Liu E collected five thousand oracle bone fragments, published the first collection of 1,058 rubbings entitled Tieyun Canggui (鐵雲藏龜, Tie Yun's [i.e., Liu E] Repository of Turtles) in 1903, and correctly identified thirty-four characters.
 Sun Yirang was the first serious researcher of oracle bones.
 Luo Zhenyu collected over 30,000 oracle bones and published several volumes, identified the names of the Shang kings, and thus positively identified the oracle bones as being artifacts from the Shang reign.
 Wang Guowei demonstrated that the commemorative cycle of the Shang kings matched the list of kings in Sima Qian's Records of the Historian.
 Dong Zuobin identified the diviners and established a chronology for the oracle bones as well as numerous other dating criteria.
 Guo Moruo editor of the Heji, the largest published collection of oracle bones. 
 Ken-ichi Takashima, first scholar to systematically treat the language of the oracle bones from the perspective of modern linguistics.

Computer encoding
A proposal to include the oracle bone script in Unicode is being prepared. Codepoints U+35400 through U+36BFF in Unicode Plane 3 (the Tertiary Ideographic Plane) have been tentatively allocated.

Samples

See also
Mojikyo – Software developed by Mojikyo researchers that includes a set of oracle bone characters.
Chinese family of scripts

Notes

References

Citations

Bibliography

Boltz, William G. (1994; revised 2003). The Origin and Early Development of the Chinese Writing System. American Oriental Series, vol. 78. American Oriental Society, New Haven, Connecticut, USA. 
Chen Zhaorong 陳昭容. (2003) Qinxi wenzi yanjiu: Cong hanzi-shi de jiaodu kaocha 秦系文字研究 ﹕从漢字史的角度考察 (Research on the Qin (Ch'in) Lineage of Writing: An Examination from the Perspective of the History of Chinese Writing). Taipei: Academia Sinica, Institute of History and Philology Monograph. .
Gao Ming 高明 (1996). Zhongguo Guwenzi Xuetonglun 中国古文字学通论. Beijing: Beijing University Press. 
Keightley, David N. (1978). Sources of Shang History: The Oracle-Bone Inscriptions of Bronze Age China. University of California Press, Berkeley. Large format hardcover,  (out of print); A 1985 ppbk 2nd edition also printed, .
Keightley, David N. (2000). The Ancestral Landscape: Time, Space, and Community in Late Shang China (ca. 1200–1045 B.C.). China Research Monograph 53, Institute of East Asian Studies, University of California – Berkeley. , ppbk.
Liu Xiang 刘翔 et al., (1989, 3rd reprint 1996). Shang-zhou guwenzi duben 商周古文字读本 (Reader of Shang-Zhou Ancient Characters). Yuwen Publishers. 
Qiu Xigui Chinese Writing (2000). Translation by Gilbert L. Mattos and Jerry Norman. Early China Special Monograph Series No. 4. Berkeley: The Society for the Study of Early China and the Institute of East Asian Studies, University of California, Berkeley. .
Shen, Chen. (2002). Anyang and Sanxingdui: Unveiling the Mysteries of Ancient Chinese Civilizations. Royal Ontario Museum, Toronto. 
Thorp, Robert L. "The Date of Tomb 5 at Yinxu, Anyang: A Review Article," Artibus Asiae (Volume 43, Number 3, 1981): 239–246.
 
Xu Yahui 許雅惠 (2002). Ancient Chinese Writing, Oracle Bone Inscriptions from the Ruins of Yin. Illustrated guide to the Special Exhibition of Oracle Bone Inscriptions from the Institute of History and Philology, Academia Sinica. English translation by Mark Caltonhill and Jeff Moser. National Palace Museum, Taipei. Govt. Publ. No. 1009100250.
Zhao Cheng 趙誠 (1988). Jiǎgǔwén Jiǎnmíng Cídiǎn – Bǔcí Fēnlèi Dúbĕn 甲骨文簡明詞典 – 卜辭分類讀本. Beijing: Zhōnghúa Shūjú, /H•22

External links

 More on Oracle Bone Script, at BeyondCalligraphy.com
 
 

Divination
History of the Chinese script
Shang dynasty
Obsolete writing systems
Oraculology
Yinxu